Travelers of Space is a 1951 anthology of science fiction short stories edited by Martin Greenberg.  The stories originally appeared in the magazines Planet Stories, Astounding SF, Thrilling Wonder Stories and Startling Stories.

Contents
 Foreword, by Martin Greenberg
 Introduction, by Willy Ley
 "The Rocketeers Have Shaggy Ears", by Keith Bennett
 "Christmas Tree", by Christopher S. Youd
 "The Forgiveness of Tenchu Taen", by Frederic Arnold Kummer
 "Episode on Dhee Minor", by Harry Walton
 "The Shape of Things", by Ray Bradbury
 "Columbus Was a Dope", by Lyle Monroe (pseudonym for Robert A. Heinlein)
 "Attitude", by Hal Clement
 "The Ionian Cycle", by William Tenn
 "Trouble on Tantalus", by P. Schuyler Miller
 "Placet Is a Crazy Place", by Fredric Brown
 "Action on Azura", by Robertson Osborne
 "The Rull", by A. E. van Vogt
 "The Double Dyed Villains", by Poul Anderson
 "Bureau of Slick Tricks", by H. B. Fyfe
 "Life on Other Worlds", by Edd Cartier
 "The Interstellar Zoo", by David A. Kyle
 Science Fiction Dictionary

Reception
P. Schuyler Miller noted that Greenberg had limited his selections to "largely if not entirely unanthologized stories," limiting the contents to lesser if less familiar stories on the central theme.

References

Sources

1951 anthologies
Science fiction anthologies
Gnome Press books